The East-West Railway Line or the Mechi-Mahakali Railway is an upcoming project in Nepal. The railway will be the longest in Nepal, stretching  expanding from the Eastern Indo-Nepal border of Kakarbhitta to the Western Indo-Nepal border of Kanchanpur.

History
The government developed the concept of the East-West Railway in 2007, forming the Department of Railways in 2011. The project started in 2008, but due to various economic, environmental and coordination challenges it was delayed until March 2020.

Features
The network is expected to grow to 4,000  km within 20 years. This railway line is important for Nepal because it has long been dependent on India for its connection with the world through the Port of Kolkata and Vizag Port.

Controversies
Lack of coordination of inter-governmental bodies and conflicts between the locals and the construction company for land acquisition and deforestation stimulated controversy. The proposed route passes through Chitwan National Park, a World Heritage site. The route was widely criticized and the proposal was rejected by UNESCO. It also was criticized for threatening rare wildlife.

Progress
More than Rs2 billion was spent for land acquisition and research and development, which will cost some Rs8 billion. The total cost is estimated to reach $3 billion. The initial track-bed has been laid across the 70 km Bardibas-Nijgadh section. The senior divisional engineer at the Department of Railways, Aman Chitrakar informed that the tracks will be laid after the construction of the track-bed from Kakadbhitta, Jhapa to Gaddachauki, Kanchanpur. A total of Rs 11.22 billion has been spent. The Government of Nepal is allocating Rs 4 billion annually for the expansion of the railway.

Under the Bardibas-Simra Railway Project, of the 108-kilometre section, track bedding work on the 70-kilometre section (Bardibas to Nijgadh) is almost completed. About 50 km of track bedding is already finished. The construction of bridges and installation of culvert along the section is underway.

Section
The railway project is being constructed in nine sections as below:
 Inaruwa–Kakarvitta Railway Project
 Inaruwa–Bardibas Railway Project
 Bardibas–Simra Railway Project
 Simra–Tamasariya Railway Project
 Tamasiya–Butwal Railway Project
 Butwal–Lamahi Railway Project
 Lamahi–Kohalpur Railway Project
 Kohalpur–Sukkhad Railway Project
 Sukhad–Gaddachowki Railway Project

References

Rail infrastructure in Nepal
Proposed railway lines in Asia
Proposed transport infrastructure in Nepal
National Pride Projects